The Qingyuan Pumped Storage Power Station is a 1,280 MW pumped-storage hydroelectric power station about  northwest of Qingyuan in Qingxin District, Guangdong Province, China. Construction on the project began in October 2008. The upper reservoir began impounding water in March 2013 and the first generator and all four generators were commissioned by 30 November 2015.

The power station operates by shifting water between an upper and lower reservoir to generate electricity. The lower reservoir is located on Qin River and the upper reservoir is located in a valley above the west side of the lower reservoir. During periods of low energy demand, such as at night, water is pumped from Qingyuan Lower Reservoir up to the upper reservoir. When energy demand is high, the water is released back down to the lower reservoir but the pump turbines that pumped the water up now reverse mode and serve as generators to produce electricity. The process is repeated as necessary and the plant serves as a peaking power plant. It is operated by China Southern Power Grid Company. At full load, it can last 9.1 hours of power generation.

Reservoir
The power station contains four 320 MW Francis pump turbines.

Accidents
Six workers were killed while excavating a tunnel on 19 November 2012.

See also

List of pumped-storage power stations

References

Dams in China
Rock-filled dams
Pumped-storage hydroelectric power stations in China
Hydroelectric power stations in Guangdong
Underground power stations